Želiezovce is a town in Slovakia in the Nitra Region in the Levice District, near the Hron river.

Districts 

 Jarok
 Karolína
 Mikula (1967 established)
 Rozina, named after Rozina Esterházy (Festetics) (1779 - 1854)
 Svodov (1976 established)
 Veľký Dvor
 Želiezovce

History 

The territory of the settlement was inhabited as early as the Bronze Age, the Quadi period and the Great Moravian period. The town was first mentioned in 1274. It was heavily damaged at the end of World War II.

Archeology 
The town gave name to the archeological Želiezovce group (named after a find in Veľký Pesek, now part of the village Sikenica, which was part of Želiezovce in 1986-1992).

St James Church 
The most notable monument of Želiezovce is the medieval church of St James the Greater, situated in the town centre. It was built in its current form in the mid-fourteenth century, combining a polygonal apse with a single nave. The building has been richly decorated with at least four different layers of wall painting, which survive from the late fourteenth and early fifteenth centuries. The original context of these murals has been analysed in detail in the recent monograph (2018) by Krisztina Ilko, "The Medieval Wall Paintings of the Church of St James in Želiezovce." Ilko has investigated how the wall paintings were connected to the patronage of the Becsei family who intended to develop a new dynastic seat in Želiezovce. The focal point of this research was the unique iconography of a fresco from the 1380s in the apse which depicts a celestial trial for the departing soul of the local landlord and knight George Becsei. Other surviving murals include a Man of Sorrows on the south-eastern wall of the apse, St Catherine in a sedilia in the nave, and SS Martin and Leonard of Noblac further down on the south wall of the nave.

Demographics 
According to the 2001 census, the town had 7,522 inhabitants. 51.25% of inhabitants were Hungarians, 47.10% Slovaks, 0.55% Roma and 0.49% Czechs. The religious make-up was 61.27% Roman Catholics, 18.43% people with no religious affiliation, and 6.37% Lutherans.

Features 

The town is known for a former Neoclassical residence of Count Johann Karl Esterházy, where the Austrian composer Franz Schubert taught music to the Count's daughters Maria and Karoline in the summers of 1818 and 1824. Apart from a nice large park, there is another important building: the Schubert House or Owl Chateau (Slovak: Soví zámoček, Magyar: Baglyosház), where Franz Schubert stayed, and composed some of his works. Finally, the town features a Gothic Catholic church, severely damaged in 1945.

People 
 Franz Schubert, wrote his Grand Duo and Marche militaire here
 Eduard Sacher, born here (de)
 Timea Majorova, lived here

Twin towns — sister cities

Želiezovce is twinned with:
 Miercurea Ciuc, Romania
 Makó, Hungary
 Barcs, Hungary
 Trstená, Slovakia

References

External links 

 
 https://www.muzeumzeliezovce.com

Cities and towns in Levice District
Cities and towns in Slovakia
Hungarian communities in Slovakia
1274 establishments in Europe
Esterházy family
Franz Schubert